In statistics, an L-statistic is a statistic (function of a data set) that is a linear combination of order statistics; the "L" is for "linear". These are more often referred to by narrower terms according to use, namely:

 L-estimator, using L-statistics as estimators for parameters
 L-moment, L-statistic analogs of the conventional moments

Summary statistics